Klasen is a surname of Dutch and German origin. Notable people with the surname include:

Arno Klasen (born 1967), German racecar driver 
Karl Klasen (1909–1991), German jurist and banker
Linus Klasen (born 1986), Swedish professional ice hockey player
Thomas Klasen (born 1983), German footballer and current football coach

References

Surnames of Dutch origin
Surnames of German origin